Sinasamba Kita (International title: All for You / ) is a 2007 Philippine television drama series broadcast by GMA Network. Based on a Philippine graphic novel written by Gilda Olvidado, the series is the first instalment of Sine Novela. Directed by Joel Lamangan, it stars Sheryl Cruz, Wendell Ramos, Valerie Concepcion and Carlo Aquino. It premiered on April 30, 2007 on the network's Dramarama sa Hapon line up replacing Princess Charming. The series concluded on July 27, 2007 with a total of 65 episodes. It was replaced by Kung Mahawi Man ang Ulap in its timeslot.

Cast and characters

Lead cast
 Sheryl Cruz as Divina Ferrer
 Valerie Concepcion as Nora Ferrer
 Carlo Aquino as Oscar
 Wendell Ramos as Jerry Sandoval

Supporting cast
 Gina Alajar as Corazon
 Mark Gil as Don José Ferrer
 Jackie Lou Blanco as Sylvia
 Allan Paule as Eddie
 Bing Loyzaga as Isabellita
 Ricardo Cepeda as Larry
 Raquel Villavicencio as Elvie
 Tony Mabesa as Manolo
 Jordan Herrera as Jacobo

Guest cast
 Ella Guevara as young Divina

Accolades

References

External links
 

2007 Philippine television series debuts
2007 Philippine television series endings
Filipino-language television shows
GMA Network drama series
Live action television shows based on films
Television shows set in the Philippines
Television shows based on comics